Michael Medor (born 23 May 1982 in Port Louis) is an amateur Mauritian lightweight boxer. Medor qualified for the Mauritian squad in the men's lightweight division (60 kg) at the 2004 Summer Olympics in Athens after claiming the title and receiving a berth from the second AIBA African Olympic Qualifying Tournament in Gaborone, Botswana. He lost the opening match to Mongolia's Uranchimegiin Mönkh-Erdene in the preliminary round of thirty-two with a scoring decision of 23–29. Medor was also appointed as the Mauritian flag bearer by the National Olympic Committee in the opening ceremony.

References

External links
 
ESPN Olympic Profile

1982 births
Living people
Lightweight boxers
Olympic boxers of Mauritius
Boxers at the 2004 Summer Olympics
People from Port Louis District
Mauritian male boxers